Redha Hamiani (4 May 1944 – 27 March 2021) was the Algerian minister for small business in the 1995 government of Mokdad Sifi.

References 

1944 births
2021 deaths
Government ministers of Algeria
21st-century Algerian people